The Innocent is a 1994 American thriller crime drama made-for-television film directed by Mimi Leder and starring Kelsey Grammer, Polly Draper, and Jeff Kober.

Plot
Lieutenant Frank Barlow (Kelsey Grammer) investigates a robbery that resulted in homicide. The only witness to the crime is a nine-year-old autistic boy named Gregory White (Keegan MacIntosh). When the killers learn of Gregory's existence, they target him, and to protect the child, Barlow takes him to his rural cabin. While there, Barlow, whose own son died a year previously, bonds with Gregory.

Cast
 Kelsey Grammer as Detective Frank Barlow
 Polly Draper as Pamela Sutton
 Jeff Kober as Tinsley
Gary Werntz as Bates
 Amy Steel as Molly
Keegan MacIntosh as Gregory White
 Dean Stockwell as Captain Jason Flaboe
Baron Kelly as Perkins
Bob McCracken as Elbert
 Ellia English as Reverend Poppy
 Jack Black as Marty Prago

References

External links

1994 television films
1994 films
American crime thriller films
American crime drama films
1990s English-language films
Films about autism
Films directed by Mimi Leder
NBC network original films
Films scored by Anthony Marinelli
1990s American films